André Gérard (3 July 1911 – 26 May 1994) was a French football player and manager. He played as a goalkeeper for Bordeaux.

In France, he coached Bordeaux, FC Nancy, Toulon, Stade Français and Rouen. He also had a stint for the Tunisia national team.

References

1911 births
1994 deaths
French footballers
Association football goalkeepers
FC Girondins de Bordeaux players
Ligue 2 players
French football managers
FC Girondins de Bordeaux managers
SC Toulon managers
FC Rouen managers
1963 African Cup of Nations managers
French expatriate football managers
French expatriate sportspeople in Tunisia
Expatriate football managers in Tunisia